The 2011 United Nations Security Council election was held on 21 and 24 October 2011 during the Sixty-sixth session of the United Nations General Assembly, held at United Nations Headquarters in New York City. The General Assembly elected Azerbaijan, Guatemala, Morocco, Pakistan, and Togo, as the five new non-permanent members of the UN Security Council for two-year mandates commencing on 1 January 2012. Azerbaijan was elected after 17 rounds on 24 October, while the other four new members were chosen on 21 October.

Notably, Azerbaijan and Guatemala were elected to the Council for the first time.

Rules
The Security Council has 15 seats, filled by five permanent members and ten non-permanent members. Each year, half of the non-permanent members are elected for two-year terms. A sitting member may not immediately run for re-election.

In accordance with the rules whereby the ten non-permanent UNSC seats rotate among the various regional blocs into which UN member states traditionally divide themselves for voting and representation purposes, the five available seats are allocated as follows:

Two for African countries (held by Gabon and Nigeria), with one of them being the "Arab swing seat"
One for countries from the Asia-Pacific Group (held by Lebanon)
One for Latin America and the Caribbean (held by Brazil)
One for the Eastern European Group (held by Bosnia and Herzegovina)

To be elected, a candidate must receive a two-thirds majority of those present and voting. If the vote is inconclusive after the first round, three rounds of restricted voting shall take place, followed by three rounds of unrestricted voting, and so on, until a result has been obtained. In restricted voting, only official candidates may be voted on, while in unrestricted voting, any member of the given regional group, with the exception of current Council members, may be voted on.

Candidates
Guatemala indicated it would run for the 2012–2013 term, for the seat currently occupied by Brazil. At that time, Guatemala was one of only six original UN Members to have never held a seat on the Security Council.

Azerbaijan, Hungary, and Slovenia all announced their intention to run for the single Eastern European seat.  Though Armenia did not run for the seat, the Azerbaijani Trend news agency had previously reported about an Armenian withdrawal of its bid, while reading the alleged candidature as "certainly viewed as Armenia's defeat". The Arab League indicated it would support Azerbaijan's candidature.

Mauritania, Morocco and Togo sought to be elected to the two African seats.

Pakistan had announced its intention to run for the single Asian seat in October 2010. A Pakistani diplomat noted that Pakistan had supported India's candidacy for a non-permanent seat in the 2010 election, and hoped that India would support Pakistan's candidacy in 2011. Fiji had originally sought to run for the seat, but deferred in Pakistan's favour. Kyrgyzstan has also made known its candidacy on 22 September 2011.

Result

African Group

Asia-Pacific Group

Fiji had already withdrawn its campaign in favour of Pakistan before the election.

Latin American and Caribbean Group
Guatemala ran unopposed for the GRULAC seat, and was elected with 191 votes in the first round of voting, with two abstentions.

Eastern European Group

Day 1

After eight rounds of inconclusive voting, General Assembly President Nassir Abdulaziz al-Nasser initially decided to reschedule the next round of voting for 24 October following the election of members to the Economic and Social Council. However, Azerbaijan requested the ballot be continued for one more hour; the request was agreed to after Russian support despite opposition from France on the basis of a lack of translation services.

Though Estonia had not applied as a candidate, the 6th round, which was unrestricted, featured one vote for them.

Day 2

After 7 additional inconclusive rounds of voting on 24 October, Slovenia's delegation told the General Assembly that while it believed Slovenia would be a good addition for the Security Council, it did not approve of the way in which the election was being held and was withdrawing its candidacy as the "will of the Assembly was clear". In the 17th round that followed, Azerbaijan achieved the necessary 2/3 majority and won the Eastern European seat.

Ramifications
With the election of Pakistan to the Security Council, seven of the nine countries known to have nuclear weapons are members of the Council in 2012: China, France, India, Pakistan, Russia, the United States and the United Kingdom (the two nuclear powers not on the Council in 2012 are Israel and North Korea).

See also
European Union and the United Nations
Fiji and the United Nations
List of members of the United Nations Security Council
Pakistan and the United Nations

References

External links
UN Document A/66/PV.37 Official record of General Assembly meeting, 21 October 2011, 10 a.m.
UN Document A/66/PV.38 Official record of General Assembly meeting, 21 October 2011, 3.45 p.m.
UN Document A/66/PV.39 Official record of General Assembly meeting, 24 October 2011, 10 a.m.

2011 elections
2011
Non-partisan elections
2011 in international relations
October 2011 events